Vasco Guedes de Carvalho e Meneses (5 April 1822 – 1 January 1905) was a Portuguese colonial administrator and a military officer. He was a younger brother of José Guedes de Carvalho e Meneses who was governor of Mozambique and Cape Verde.

He was governor general of Mozambique from 24 April 1854 until 26 September 1857. He was governor general of Cape Verde from 22 December 1876 until 7 May 1878, when he became governor of Angola, an office he fulfilled until July 1880. He was governor of Portuguese India from 16 June 1889 until 10 March 1891.

He was Commander of the Order of Nossa Senhora da Conceição de Vila Viçosa.

See also
List of colonial governors of Cape Verde
List of colonial governors of Angola
List of colonial governors of Mozambique
List of governors of Portuguese India

Notes

1822 births
1905 deaths
Portuguese Mozambique
Colonial heads of Cape Verde
Governors of Portuguese Angola
Governors-General of Portuguese India
Portuguese colonial governors and administrators